Allocrangonyx is a genus of troglobitic amphipod crustaceans from the South Central United States. The two species are both listed as vulnerable on the IUCN Red List. The animals are blind and unpigmented. During the male's development, the outer ramus of the third uropod differentiates into secondary segments and grows to a length greater than the animal's body length.

Allocrangonyx pellucidus
A. pellucidus, the "Oklahoma cave amphipod", is known from caves and springs in the Arbuckle Mountains of Johnston, Murray and Pontotoc counties, Oklahoma.

Allocrangonyx hubrichti
While the well is drilled into Pennsylvanian age sandstone, all previous records have been from Ordovician limestones and dolomites.

References

Gammaridea
Crustaceans of the United States
Freshwater crustaceans of North America
Taxonomy articles created by Polbot
Cave crustaceans